Richard Binder (July 26, 1839 – February 26, 1912) was an American Civil War Marine Corps Sergeant and a recipient of America's highest military decoration - the Medal of Honor. His birth name was Richard Bigle.

Biography
Richard Binder is described as having been born in either Philadelphia, Pennsylvania, or Germany. He enlisted in the Marine Corps from Philadelphia in July 1861. In 1864–65, he was assigned to the sloop-of-war . He participated in the two assaults on Fort Fisher, North Carolina, on 24-December 25, 1864 (First Battle of Fort Fisher) and 13-January 15, 1865 (Second Battle of Fort Fisher). He was awarded the Medal of Honor for his performance at those times. Richard Binder died on February 26, 1912, and was buried in West Laurel Hill Cemetery, Bala Cynwyd, Pennsylvania.

Medal of Honor citation

Sergeant Richard Binder's official Medal of Honor citation is as follows:

On board the  during the attacks on Fort Fisher, 24 and December 25, 1864, and 13 to January 15, 1865. Despite heavy return fire by the enemy and the explosion of the 100-pounder Parrott rifle which killed eight men and wounded 12 more, Sgt. Binder, as captain of a gun, performed his duties with skill and courage during the first two days of battle. As his ship again took position on the 13th, he remained steadfast as the Ticonderoga maintained a well-placed fire upon the batteries on shore, and thereafter, as she materially lessened the power of guns on the mound which had been turned upon our assaulting columns. During this action the flag was planted on one of the strongest fortifications possessed by the rebels.

See also

List of American Civil War Medal of Honor recipients: A–F

References

External links

1839 births
1912 deaths
United States Marine Corps Medal of Honor recipients
United States Marine Corps non-commissioned officers
Union Marines
German emigrants to the United States
Military personnel from Philadelphia
American Civil War recipients of the Medal of Honor
Burials at West Laurel Hill Cemetery
People of Pennsylvania in the American Civil War